Academy of Design may refer to:

National Academy Museum and School in New York City
RCC Institute of Technology